Kawade Shibatarō (1856–1921) was a Japanese artist working in  (cloisonné enamel). As head of the Ando Cloisonné Company, he introduced a number of technical innovations, expanding the colours that could be rendered in enamel and bringing the company to a new level of success. Under his leadership, the company exhibited at world's fairs, winning multiple awards. It was also appointed as an official supplier of cloisonné works for the Japanese imperial family.

Biography 

Kawade came to prominence during the "Golden Age" of Japanese cloisonné in the late Meiji era. This was a time of experimentation and technical innovation, when Japanese artists produced works more advanced than had been achieved before, which could not be replicated with modern techniques. During the 1880s he ran his own workshop and also worked for the Ando Cloisonné Company in Nagoya. In 1902 he became the head of the company, succeeding Kaji Satarō.

In 1902, he was the first Japanese artist to use the  technique, in which the metal foundation is hammered outwards to create a relief effect. He also used the new  technique ( in Japanese) which creates panels of transparent or semi-transparent enamel. Enamel , linked by wires, are prepared on a copper surface which is then burned away with acid while the enamel itself is protected by lacquer. This was invented in France and came to Japan when Ando Jubei, one of the founders of the Ando Cloisonné Company, bought an enamel by André Fernand Thesmar at the Paris Exposition of 1900. Kawade analysed this piece to replicate and then further develop the technique.

Recognition 
Kawade exhibited works at the World's Columbian Exposition of 1893 in Chicago, at Japan's fifth National Industrial Exposition in 1903, at the Louisiana Purchase Exposition of 1904, at the Universal and International Exposition in Liège in 1905, and at the Japan-British Exhibition of 1910 in London. He won a gold medal at the Panama–Pacific International Exposition of 1915 in San Francisco.

The Ando Cloisonné Company was chosen as a supplier of art for the Imperial family and as such was commissioned to make works, bearing the Imperial chrysanthemum seal, that the family could present as gifts. One such work, executed by Kawade in 1906, was a pair of vases presented by the Emperor to the American cartoonist Henry Mayer, thanking him for cartoons on the Russo-Japanese War published in The New York Times.

He is considered one of the four great masters of Japanese cloisonné, along with Namikawa Yasuyuki, Namikawa Sosuke and Hayashi Kodenji.

Outside of Japan his works are in collections including the Metropolitan Museum of Art, the George Walter Vincent Smith Art Museum, the Los Angeles County Museum of Art, and the Khalili Collection of Japanese Art of the Meiji Era.

Gallery

Notes

References

Bibliography

Further reading

External links 

 川出柴太郎，安藤七宝，東京，銀座 | 銀座 真生堂
 川出柴太郎　銅七宝仏手柑図花瓶 :: 東文研アーカイブデータベース
 川出柴太郎　銅七宝紫蘭盛上花瓶 :: 東文研アーカイブデータベース

1856 births
1921 deaths
Japanese enamellers